Jamuna Paar is an Indian drama aired on Imagine TV. The show started on 27 February 2012 and ended on 12 April 2012. It was produced by Rajan Shahi under Director's Kut Production.

The show ended abruptly within 2 months due to the closure of the respective channel.

Plot
Jamuna Paar is a story about two people who are just looking for their soul mate and love of their life's but eventually they find each other.  Also they discover they don't have to change themselves for another because they love each other just the way they are.

Cast

Main
 Ankur Verma as Brijesh Kumar Katewa  Bijju - Male Lead
 Vidhi Parekh as Vidhi Malhotra

Recurring
 Abhay Joshi as Fatehchand Katewa - Bijju's tau
 Alisha Ahluwalia as Jassi
 Poonam Chauvan as Bhakti Katewa tai
 Sushil Khosala as Sushil Katewa - Bijju's cousin brother 
 Rajshri Deshpande as Kanchan Katewa - Bijju's sister in law & Sushil's wife
 Devender Chaudhry as Manikchand Katewa - Bijju's father
 Sapna Sand as Shanti Katewa - Bijju's mother
 Abhishek Gupta as Prakash Katewa - Bijju's elder brother
 Anjali Rana as Manju Katewa - Bijju's sister in law & Prakash's wife
 Tanya Abrol as Kalpana Kotwal - Bijju's sister & married to SRK
 Dheeraj Mijlani as Sant Ram Kotwal a.k.a. SRK - Bijju's brother in law & Kalpana's husband 
 Sohail as Chintu - Kanchan and Sushil's Son
 Ajay Raj Tomar as Mr. Sinha - Vidhi's Boutique's Manager

References

Imagine TV original programming
Indian television soap operas
Indian television series
2012 Indian television series debuts
2012 Indian television series endings